Sylvia Jones  (born ) is a Canadian politician who has served as the deputy premier of Ontario and Ontario minister of health since June 24, 2022. Jones sits as the member of Provincial Parliament (MPP) for Dufferin—Caledon, representing the Progressive Conservative (PC) party, and has held her seat since she was first elected following the 2007 general election. She joined the provincial cabinet after the PCs formed government in 2018, and has been the minister of tourism, culture and sport, the minister of community safety and correctional services, and the solicitor general of Ontario.

Background
Jones grew up on her family's farm. She attended Fanshawe College, where she received a diploma in radio broadcasting. She worked as an executive assistant for former PC party leader John Tory. She and her husband David live in Dufferin County and are the parents of two children.

Politics
Jones ran in the 2007 provincial election as the Progressive Conservative candidate in the new riding of Dufferin—Caledon. She was re-elected in 2011 and 2014. The Ontario PCs were in opposition from the time of Jones' election to the 2018 provincial election.

In opposition 
During her time in opposition, Jones introduced several private member's bills. These include the Protecting Vulnerable People Against Picketing Act, Criminal Record Checks for Volunteers Act, Social Assistance Statute Law Amendment Act, and the Aggregate Recycling Promotion Act. Only the Aggregate Recycling Promotion Act in 2014 made it past first reading. The bill made it to third reading before it died on the order paper when the 2014 election was called. Another private member's, Bill 94, which would have ensured that Ontario Disability Support Program payments could not be scaled back as a result of Registered Disability Support Program contributions, was eventually adopted by the Liberal government through regulation.

She was named the co-deputy leader on September 10, 2015 following a shadow cabinet shuffle.

In government
The Ontario PC Party formed government following the 2018 election, with newly elected Premier Doug Ford appointing Jones as the minister of tourism, culture and sport. In November, Jones took over as the minister of community safety and correctional services role. Her title was changed to Solicitor General in April 2019 and the name of her ministry was also restored to Ministry of the Solicitor General, as it had been prior to 2002.

As Solicitor General, Jones played a role in the PC government's response to the COVID-19 pandemic in Ontario, as the mandate of her portfolio includes overseeing policing and law enforcement.

COVID-19 

Amid growing case numbers in 2021, the government moved to introduce a third province-wide shutdown. As part of the response, Jones announced on April 16, 2021 that she would be authorizing police and bylaw enforcement to require anyone who is not in a private residence to explain why they’re not at home and provide their home address, as well as pull people over while driving to ask why they are not at home. The regulations raised concerns about a re-legalization of carding. Indeed, the government experienced significant backlash with the new enforcement measures, with some commentators – such as the National Post's Randall Denley, a former PC politician – equating the province to a "police state". After 21 police services across the province announced that they would refuse to enforce the new measures, and round criticism in the media, Jones' government promptly amended the new regulation the next day and rescinded the new enforcement powers.

Minister of Health and Deputy Premier 
Following the 2022 provincial election, Premier Ford named Jones as the new deputy premier and minister of health, replacing Christine Elliott, who did not seek re-election.

Notes

References

External links

1965 births
Living people
Members of the Executive Council of Ontario
Progressive Conservative Party of Ontario MPPs
Women government ministers of Canada
Women MPPs in Ontario
People from Dufferin County
Fanshawe College alumni
21st-century Canadian politicians
21st-century Canadian women politicians
Solicitors general of Canadian provinces